Charles Shonta (born August 29, 1937 in Detroit, Michigan) is a former college and professional American football defensive back. He attended Eastern Michigan University and played football there. In 1960, he joined the Boston Patriots of the upstart American Football League. He played there for eight seasons and was a one-time AFL All-Star selection, and is a member of the Patriots All-1960s (AFL) Team.

See also
Other American Football League players

External links
Patriots All-1960s (AFL) Team

Eastern Michigan University alumni
Eastern Michigan Eagles football players
Players of American football from Detroit
Pershing High School alumni
Boston Patriots players
1937 births
Living people
American football defensive backs
American Football League All-Star players